The United States competed at the 1952 Summer Olympics in Helsinki, Finland. 286 competitors – 245 men and 41 women – took part in 133 events in 18 sports. They won 76 medals (40 gold), including 6 podium sweeps; the highest number of medal sweeps in a single Olympiad by one country since World War II and still a record (though achieved a few more times since).

Medalists

Gold
Lindy Remigino — Athletics, Men's 100 metres
Andy Stanfield — Athletics, Men's 200 metres
Mal Whitfield — Athletics, Men's 800 metres
Harrison Dillard — Athletics, Men's 110 m Hurdles 
Charles Moore — Athletics, Men's 400 m Hurdles 
Horace Ashenfelter — Athletics, Men's 3000 m Steeplechase 
Harrison Dillard, Lindy Remigino, Dean Smith, and Andy Stanfield — Athletics, Men's 4 × 100 m Relay Men 
Walt Davis — Athletics, Men's High Jump 
Bob Richards — Athletics, Men's Pole Vault 
Jerome Biffle — Athletics, Men's Long Jump 
Parry O'Brien — Athletics, Men's Shot Put 
Sim Iness — Athletics, Men's Discus Throw 
Cy Young — Athletics, Men's Javelin Throw 
Bob Mathias — Athletics, Men's Decathlon 
Mae Faggs, Catherine Hardy, Barbara Jones, and Janet Moreau — Athletics, Women's 4 × 100 m Relay 
Ron Bontemps, Marc Freiberger, Wayne Glasgow, Charlie Hoag, Bill Hougland, John Keller, Dean Kelley, Bob Kenney, Bob Kurland, Bill Lienhard, Clyde Lovellette, Frank McCabe, Dan Pippin, and Howie Williams — Basketball, Men's Team Competition
Nathan Brooks — Boxing, Men's Flyweight
Charles Adkins — Boxing, Men's Light Welterweight
Floyd Patterson — Boxing, Men's Middleweight
Norvel Lee — Boxing, Men's Light Heavyweight
Edward Sanders — Boxing, Men's Heavyweight
Frank Havens — Canoeing, Men's C1 10,000 m Canadian Singles 
David Browning — Diving, Men's Springboard Diving 
Sammy Lee — Diving, Men's Platform Diving
Pat McCormick — Diving, Women's Springboard Diving 
Pat McCormick — Diving, Women's Platform Diving 
Charlie Logg and Tom Price — Rowing, Men's Coxless Pairs 
Robert Detweiler, James Dunbar, William Fields, Wayne Frye, Charles Manring, Richard Murphy, Henry Proctor, Frank Shakespeare, and Edward Stevens — Rowing, Men's Eights 
Joe Benner — Shooting, Men's Free Pistol 
Clarke Scholes — Swimming, Men's 100 m Freestyle 
Ford Konno — Swimming, Men's 1500 m Freestyle 
Yoshi Oyakawa — Swimming, Men's 100 m Backstroke 
Ford Konno, Jimmy McLane, Wayne Moore, and Bill Woolsey — Swimming, Men's 4 × 200 m Freestyle Relay 
Tommy Kono — Weightlifting, Men's Lightweight 
Peter George — Weightlifting, Men's Middleweight 
Norbert Schemansky — Weightlifting, Men's Middle Heavyweight 
John Davis — Weightlifting, Men's Heavyweight
William Smith — Wrestling, Men's Freestyle Welterweight
Britton Chance, Edgar White, and Sumner White — Sailing, Men's 5½ Meter Class 
Everard Endt, John Morgan, Eric Ridder, Julian Roosevelt, Emelyn Whiton, and Herman Whiton — Sailing, Men's 6 Meter Class 4870

Silver
Thane Baker — Athletics, Men's 200 metres
Bob McMillen — Athletics, Men's 1500 metres
Jack Davis — Athletics, Men's 110 m Hurdles 
Gene Cole, Ollie Matson, Charles Moore, and Mal Whitfield — Athletics, Men's 4 × 400 m Relay 
Ken Wiesner — Athletics, Men's High Jump 
Don Laz — Athletics, Men's Pole Vault 
Meredith Gourdine — Athletics, Men's Long Jump 
Darrow Hooper — Athletics, Men's Shot Put 
Bill Miller — Athletics, Men's Javelin Throw 
Milt Campbell — Athletics, Men's Decathlon 
Miller Anderson — Diving, Men's Springboard Diving 
Paula Myers-Pope — Diving, Women's Platform Diving 
Ford Konno — Swimming, Men's 400 m Freestyle 
Bowen Stassforth — Swimming, Men's 200 m Breaststroke 
Stanley Stanczyk — Weightlifting, Men's Light Heavyweight 
James Bradford — Weightlifting, Men's Heavyweight 
Jay Thomas Evans — Wrestling, Men's Freestyle Lightweight
Henry Wittenberg — Wrestling, Men's Freestyle Light Heavyweight 
John Price and John Reid — Sailing, Men's Star

Bronze
James Gathers — Athletics, Men's 200 metres
Ollie Matson — Athletics, Men's 400 metres
Arthur Barnard — Athletics, Men's 110 m Hurdles 
James Fuchs — Athletics, Men's Shot Put 
James Dillion — Athletics, Men's Discus Throw 
Floyd Simmons — Athletics, Men's Decathlon 
Bob Clotworthy — Diving, Men's Springboard Diving 
Zoe Olsen-Jensen — Diving, Women's Springboard Diving 
Juno Irwin — Diving, Women's Platform Diving 
Charles Hough, Jr., Walter Staley, and John Wofford — Equestrian, Three-Day Event Team Competition 
Arthur McCashin, John Russell, and William Steinkraus — Equestrian, Jumping Team Competition 
Matt Leanderson, Carl Lovsted, Al Rossi, Al Ulbrickson, and Richard Wahlstrom — Rowing, Men's Coxed Fours 
Arthur Jackson — Shooting, Men's Small-bore Rifle, Prone 
Jack Taylor — Swimming, Men's 100 m Backstroke 
Evelyn Kawamoto — Swimming, Women's 400 m Freestyle 
Jody Alderson, Evelyn Kawamoto, Jackie LaVine, and Marilee Stepan — Swimming, Women's 4 × 100 m Freestyle Relay 
Josiah Henson — Wrestling, Men's Freestyle Featherweight

Athletics

Men's 100 metres
 Lindy Remigino
 First Round – 10.4s
 Second Round – 10.4s
 Semifinals – 10.5s
 Final – 10.4s (→  Gold Medal)

 Dean Smith
 First Round – 10.6s
 Second Round – 10.4s
 Semifinals – 10.6s
 Final – 10.4s (→ 4th place)

Basketball

Men's Team Competition
Main Round (Group A)
 Defeated Hungary (66-48)
 Defeated Czechoslovakia (72-47)
 Defeated Uruguay (57-44) 
Final Round (Group B)
 Defeated Soviet Union (86-58)
 Defeated Chile (103-55)
 Defeated Brazil (57-53) 
Semifinals
 Defeated Argentina (85-76)
Final
 Defeated Soviet Union (36-25) →  Gold Medal
Team Roster
Ronald Bontemps
Marcus Freiberger
Wayne Glasgow
Charles Hoag
Bill Hougland
John Keller
Dean Kelley
Robert Kenney
Robert Kurland
Bill Lienhard
Clyde Lovellette
Frank McCabe
Dan Pippin
Howie Williams
George Lafferty

Boxing

Canoeing

Cycling

Road Competition
Men's Individual Road Race (190.4 km)
Donald Sheldon — 5:22:33.3 (→ 32nd place)
Thomas O'Rourke — 5:22:33.7 (→ 36th place)
David Rhoads — did not finish (→ no ranking)
Ronald Rhoads — did not finish (→ no ranking)

Track Competition
Men's 1.000m Time Trial
Frank Brilando
 Final — 1:17.8 (→ 23rd place)

Men's 1.000m Sprint Scratch Race
Steven Hromjak — 22nd place

Men's 4.000 m Team Pursuit
 Steven Hromjak, James Lauf,  Tom Montemage, Donald Sheldon — 5:11.6 (18th place, qualifying round)

Diving

Men's 3m Springboard
David Browning
 Final — 205.29 points (→  Gold Medal)

Miller Anderson
 Final — 199.84 points (→  Silver Medal)

Bob Clotworthy
 Final — 184.92 points (→  Bronze Medal)

Women's 10m Platform
Pat McCormick
 Preliminary Round — 51.25 points
 Final — 79.37 points (→  Gold Medal)

Paula Myers-Pope
 Preliminary Round — 44.22 points
 Final — 71.63 points (→  Silver Medal)

Juno Stover-Irwin
 Preliminary Round — 43.60 points
 Final — 70.49 points (→  Bronze Medal)

Equestrian

Fencing

20 fencers represented the United States in 1952.

Men's foil
 Nate Lubell
 Albie Axelrod
 Daniel Bukantz

Men's team foil
 Silvio Giolito, Albie Axelrod, Nate Lubell, Byron Krieger, Daniel Bukantz, Hal Goldsmith

Men's épée
 Edward Vebell
 Paul Makler, Sr.
 Alfred Skrobisch

Men's team épée
 Edward Vebell, Paul Makler, Sr., Alfred Skrobisch, Joe de Capriles, James Strauch, Albert Wolff

Men's sabre
 Joe de Capriles
 George Worth
 Allan Kwartler

Men's team sabre
 Norman Cohn-Armitage, Joe de Capriles, Tibor Nyilas, Alex Treves, George Worth, Allan Kwartler

Women's foil
 Jan York-Romary
 Maxine Mitchell
 Polly Craus

Football

 Preliminary round

Roster:
Bob Burkard
Charlie Colombo
Bill Conterio
Elwood Cook
Jack Dunn
Harry Keough
Ed McHugh
Ruben Mendoza
Lloyd Monsen
Willy Schaller
Bill Sheppell
John Souza
Larry Surock

Coach: John Wood

Gymnastics

Modern pentathlon

Three pentathletes represented the United States in 1952.

Individual
 Frederick Denman
 Thad McArthur
 Guy Troy

Team
 Frederick Denman
 Thad McArthur
 Guy Troy

Rowing

The United States had 26 rowers participate in all seven rowing events in 1952.

 Men's single sculls
 John B. Kelly Jr.

 Men's double sculls
 Pat Costello
 Walter Hoover

 Men's coxless pair
 Charlie Logg
 Tom Price

 Men's coxed pair
 James Fifer
 Duvall Hecht
 James Beggs (cox)

 Men's coxless four
 Louis McMillan
 Dempster Jackson
 John Davis
 James Welsh

 Men's coxed four
 Carl Lovsted
 Al Ulbrickson
 Richard Wahlstrom
 Matt Leanderson
 Al Rossi (cox)

 Men's eight
 Frank Shakespeare
 William Fields
 James Dunbar
 Richard Murphy
 Robert Detweiler
 Henry Proctor
 Wayne Frye
 Edward Stevens
 Charles Manring (cox)

Sailing

Shooting

Six shooters represented the United States in 1952. Huelet Benner won gold in the 50 m pistol and Art Jackson won bronze in the 50 m rifle, prone.

25 m pistol
 William McMillan
 Huelet Benner

50 m pistol
 Huelet Benner
 Harry Reeves

300 m rifle, three positions
 Robert Sandager
 Emmett Swanson

50 m rifle, three positions
 Art Jackson
 Emmett Swanson

50 m rifle, prone
 Art Jackson
 Emmett Swanson

Swimming

Water polo

Weightlifting

Wrestling

References

External links
 

Nations at the 1952 Summer Olympics
1952
Oly